Animal love or animal lover may refer to:

 Human-animal bonding, affectional relationships between humans and companion animals
 Concern for animal welfare, the well-being of all animals
 Emotion in animals
 Pair bond, affectional bonding between animals
 Zoophilia, sexual relationships between humans and animals
 Animal Love, a 1996 documentary film directed by Ulrich Seidl